Cosmo Kyrle Bellew (November 23, 1883–January 25, 1948) was a British/American vaudeville and film actor.

Biography
Bellew claimed to have been born in London, England, and claimed to be the son of noted silent film actor Kyrle Bellew (Kyrle Bellew, at his death, was reported to be "unmarried"- long divorced after a brief marriage- and "survived by a sister", with no mention of a son or any other children). His actual birth date is unclear- no birth record being apparent- with various subsequent official documents giving dates between 1874 and 1883. He immigrated to the United States in 1914, and began his career as a vaudeville actor, appearing in The Devil's Mate in 1915.

In 1917 he enlisted in the British Army in World War I.

Following the war he continued his career in theater, appearing in the musical vaudeville skit Somewhere in France in 1918, when he was stranded in Omaha, Nebraska by the Spanish flu, and was reduced to working in a meat-packing plant and subsisting on free meals. He appeared in the musicals Dearie and The Canary in 1920, and The Boy and Good Morning Judge in 1921,

In 1926 he appeared on stage in the Ziegfeld musical Louie the Fourteenth, and the Fox Film Summer Bachelors (as Bachelor No. 3).

In 1927 he moved to Los Angeles and signed with Sam Goldwyn. Following this, he appeared in a number of films, although never in a starring role. In 1928 he appeared in Hit of the Show, starring Joe E. Brown, The Bellamy Trial, The Magic Flame starring Ronald Colman and Vilma Banky, and Man, Woman and Sin, which starred John Gilbert.

Filmography

Personal
Bellew was notable for his "young face" that was "emphasized by his snow-white hair, it having turned grey at the age of 18." It was also reported that, as a singer, he had an "excellent voice."

In 1925 he married Anita Blun in Greenwich, Connecticut. She later appeared with him in Lummox. The couple had no children. In his later years Bellew suffered from a heart condition, and died at home in Beverly Hills on January 25, 1948. Anita died on May 15, 1960. The couple are buried in Forest Lawn Memorial Park in Glendale, California.

References

External links
 
 
 

1883 births
1948 deaths
American male film actors
American male silent film actors
20th-century American male actors
British emigrants to the United States